Corelli is an Italian surname. Notable people with the surname include:

Arcangelo Corelli (1653–1713), Italian violinist and composer of Baroque music
Arrol Corelli (born 1985), Indian music composer
Buba Corelli, stage name of Amar Hodžić (born 1989), Bosnian rapper
Franco Corelli (1921–2003), Italian tenor
Marie Corelli (1855–1924), British novelist

Italian-language surnames